The Solovetsky Islands, or Solovki, are an archipelago located in the Onega Bay of the White Sea, Russia. As an administrative division, the islands are incorporated as Solovetsky District of Arkhangelsk Oblast, Russia. Within the  framework of municipal divisions, they are incorporated as Solovetskoye Rural Settlement within  Primorsky Municipal District. The administrative center of both divisions is the settlement of  Solovetsky, located on Bolshoy Solovetsky Island. Almost all of the population of the islands lives in Solovetsky. As of the 2010 Census, the district had a population of 861 inhabitants.

The Solovetsky Monastery (founded in 1436), in 1923 became the site of the first Gulag establishment, the Solovki prison camp.

Geography

 Bolshoy Solovetsky Island, 
 Anzersky Island (Anzer), 
 Bolshaya Muksalma, 
 Malaya Muksalma 
 Bolshoy Zayatsky Island, 
 Maly Zayatsky, 

The islands separate the Onega Bay from the main volume of the White Sea. The closest mainland is the Onega Peninsula.

The shores of the islands are very indented. They are formed of granites and gneiss. The relief of the islands is hilly (the highest point is 107 m). Most of the Solovetsky Islands are covered with Scots Pine and Norway Spruce forests, which are partially swampy. There are numerous lakes, which were joined by monks so as to form a network of canals.

One interesting feature of these islands is stone labyrinths and other stone settings, especially the Stone labyrinths of Bolshoi Zayatsky Island. Such labyrinths were typical for Northern Europe, but most have perished and now Solovetsky Islands have some of the best remaining examples.

Monastery

Historically the islands have been the setting of the famous Russian Orthodox Solovetsky Monastery complex. It was founded in the second quarter of the 15th century by two monks from the Kirillo-Belozersky Monastery. By the end of the 16th century, the abbey had emerged as one of the wealthiest landowners and most influential religious centres in Russia.

The existing stronghold and its major churches were erected in stone during the early reign of Ivan the Terrible at the behest of St. Philip of Moscow. At the onset of the Schism of the Russian Church, the monks staunchly stuck to the faith of their fathers and expelled the tsar's representatives from the Solovki, precipitating the eight-year-long siege of the islands by the forces of Tsar Alexis.

Throughout the imperial period of Russian history, the monastery was renowned as a strong fortress which repelled foreign attacks during the Livonian War (16th century), Time of Troubles (17th century), the Crimean War (19th century), and the Russian Civil War (20th century).

In 1974, the Solovetsky Islands were designated a historical and architectural museum and a natural reserve of the Soviet Union. In 1992, they were inscribed on the World Heritage List "as an outstanding example of a monastic settlement in the inhospitable environment of northern Europe which admirably illustrates the faith, tenacity, and enterprise of later medieval religious communities". Today, the Solovki are seen as one of the major tourist magnets in the orbit of the Russian North.

Labor camp

After the October Revolution, the islands attained notoriety as the site of the first Soviet prison camp (gulag). The camp was inaugurated in 1921, while Vladimir Lenin was still at the helm of Soviet Russia. It was closed in 1939, on the eve of World War II. By the beginning of the war, there was a naval cadet training camp for the Soviet Northern Fleet.

Transportation
The islands are served by the Solovki Airport. There is regular air service to Arkhangelsk, as well as ferry lines (summertime only) to Arkhangelsk, Kem, and Belomorsk.

See also
 List of islands of Russia

References

Notes

Sources

Further reading
 Brumfield, William. Solovki: Architectural Heritage in Photographs (Moscow: Tri Kvadrata, 2008). . . In English and in Russian.
 Robson, Roy. Solovki: The Story of Russia Told Through Its Most Remarkable Islands (New Haven: Yale University Press, 2008). .

External links

 
Archipelagoes of Arkhangelsk Oblast
Archipelagoes of the Arctic Ocean
Geography of Gulag
Landforms of the White Sea
Russian and Soviet Navy bases
World Heritage Sites in Russia